The Empire is the eleventh studio album by Polish death metal band Vader. The album is the band's first studio album to contain thrash metal elements more than death metal.

Track listing

Personnel

Vader
Piotr "Peter" Wiwczarek – lead guitar, vocals
Marek "Spider" Pająk – rhythm guitar
Tomasz "Hal" Halicki – bass
James Stewart – drums

Production
Wojtek and Sławek Wiesławscy – production, mixing, mastering, recording  
Joe Petagno – cover art

Charts

References

Vader (band) albums
2016 albums
Nuclear Blast albums